George Watson Wrigley (January 18, 1874 in Philadelphia – September 28, 1952), was a former professional baseball player. He played all or part of four seasons in Major League Baseball, from 1896 to 1899, primarily as a shortstop.

External links

Major League Baseball shortstops
Washington Senators (1891–1899) players
New York Giants (NL) players
Brooklyn Superbas players
Carlisle Colts players
Roanoke Magicians players
Richmond Bluebirds players
Syracuse Stars (minor league baseball) players
Worcester Farmers players
Worcester Quakers players
Worcester Hustlers players
Montreal Royals players
Worcester Riddlers players
New Orleans Pelicans (baseball) players
Columbus Senators players
St. Paul Saints (AA) players
Ottumwa Packers players
Chillicothe Infants players
Lima Cigarmakers players
Hamilton Maroons players
Trenton Tigers players
Minor league baseball managers
Baseball players from Philadelphia
19th-century baseball players
1874 births
1952 deaths